WWMD-LP (95.3 FM) is a radio station broadcasting a religious format. Licensed to Ashland, Wisconsin, United States, the station is currently owned by Holy Family Radio Association.

References

External links
 
 

WMD-LP
Ashland, Wisconsin
Radio stations established in 2007
2007 establishments in Wisconsin
WMD-LP
Relevant Radio stations
Catholic Church in Wisconsin